Păuca is a commune located in Sibiu County, Transylvania, Romania. It is composed of four villages: Bogatu Român, Broșteni, Păuca, and Presaca.

The commune is situated on the Transylvanian Plateau.

According to the census from 2011 there was a total population of 1,929 people living in this commune, of which 94.04% are ethnic Romanians, 2.44% are ethnic Romani, and 1.66% are ethnic Germans.

References

Communes in Sibiu County
Localities in Transylvania